Nanga Akhrote (also spelled Nanga Akhrote, born 25 April 2004) is an Afghan cricketer. He made his Twenty20 debut on 7 September 2020, for Kabul Eagles in the 2020 Shpageeza Cricket League. He was the joint-leading wicket-taker in the tournament, with thirteen dismissals in seven matches. He was also named the man of the match in the final of the competition, after he scored 25 runs and took two wickets, and the tournament's Best Emerging Player. He made his List A debut on 12 October 2020, for Amo Region in the 2020 Ghazi Amanullah Khan Regional One Day Tournament.

References

External links
 

2004 births
Living people
Afghan cricketers
Amo Sharks cricketers
Kabul Eagles cricketers
Place of birth missing (living people)